Lionel Sydney Birkett (April 14, 1905, Saint Michael, Barbados – January 16, 1998, Saint James, Barbados) was a West Indian cricketer who played in 4 Tests from 1930 to 1931.

References

External links
 

1905 births
1998 deaths
West Indies Test cricketers
Barbadian cricketers
Barbados cricketers
Guyana cricketers
Trinidad and Tobago cricketers
People from Saint Michael, Barbados